Acadia was a federal electoral district in Alberta, Canada, that was represented in the House of Commons of Canada from 1925 to 1968.

History
Acadia was created in 1924 from Battle River and Bow River ridings. It was abolished in 1966 when it was redistributed into Battle River, Crowfoot, Medicine Hat, Palliser and Red Deer ridings.

Members of Parliament

This riding elected the following Members of Parliament:

Robert Gardiner, Progressive/United Farmers (1925–1935)
Victor Quelch, Social Credit (1935–1958)
Jack Horner, Progressive Conservative (1958–1968)

Election results

† John Naismith campaigned under the All Canadian Party designation, the only candidate ever to do so.

See also 
 List of Canadian federal electoral districts
 Past Canadian electoral districts
 Acadia (provincial electoral district) from 1913 to 1935

External links
 

Former federal electoral districts of Alberta
1924 establishments in Alberta
1966 disestablishments in Alberta